Bobby Larios is a Mexican actor, dancer, singer, conductor, radio host, and zen coach born in Guadalajara, Jalisco. He began his career in 1996. He resides in the United States.

Acting career
In 1999, Larios had his first opportunity at acting in a telenovela, when he participated in Mujeres Enganadas.

Another character would follow, when he was hired for Tres Mujeres, filmed that same year. His second character, however, was a feature character. He played Mauro in Tres Mujeres.

In 2002, Larios participated as Julián de la Colina in Las Vías del Amor, and in the smash hit Clase 406, where he played Cesar.

By 2003, he was cast in his first starring role in Velo de Novia.

Filmography

Telenovelas 
 2009: Valeria - David Barros
 2007-2008: Amor comprado - Hilario
 2007: Isla Paraiso - Jorge
 2006: La verdad oculta - Marcos Rivera Muñoz
 2003: Velo de novia - Beto
 2002: Las vías del amor - Julián de la Colina
 2002: Clase 406 - César
 1999: Mujeres engañadas - Pedro
 1999: Tres mujeres - Mauro
 1997: Salud, dinero y amor - Sebastián
 1996-97: Tú y yo - Sebastián Dominguez

Reality shows 
 2010: Amigos y Rivales KR 3 - Participant with Fiorella Chirichigno (model)

References

External links 
 
  Bobby Larios on Alma latina website
 {https://evtvmiami.com/miami-con-venezuela-en-un-solo-corazon-este-23-de-marzo/}

1970 births
Living people
Mexican male telenovela actors